WWFM (FM, "The Classical Network") is a classical music radio station owned and operated by Mercer County Community College. The flagship station is licensed to the Trenton/Princeton market and operates from the West Windsor campus of MCCC. The Classical Network owns and operates WWFM, WWNJ, WWCJ, and WWPJ. It also broadcasts in the Philadelphia market on digital (HD) radio on 89.5 HD2.

The Classical Network offers exclusive specialty programs including The Piano Matters, What Makes It Great, Between the Keys, Kids on Keys, PostClassical, The Dress Circle, Sounds Choral, Well-Tempered Baroque, Distant Mirror, Half Past, In A Broadway Minute, The Lyric Stage, The Lost Chord, Picture Perfect, Bach at One, Celebrating Our Music Future, and Celebrating Our Musical Community. The Classical Network partners with prestigious music schools, professional ensembles and concert series presenters for concert broadcasts including Princeton University, Westminster Choir College, Manhattan School of Music, Columbia University, Mannes School of Music, Rutgers University, Temple University, Oberlin College, Northwestern University, The New Jersey Symphony Orchestra, The Princeton Symphony Orchestra and The Institute for Advanced Study in Princeton.

The Classical Network is award-winning, having won the 2014 ASCAP Foundation Deems Taylor/Virgil Thomson Radio Broadcast Award for WWFM  and for the program "Cadenza," produced and hosted by David Osenberg. In 2017 WWFM Artist-in-Residence Jed Distler won the ASCAP Foundation Deems Taylor/Virgil Thomson Award for his WWFM program "Between the Keys." "The Piano Matters" host David Dubal has also been recognized with an ASCAP Foundation Deems Taylor/Virgil Thomson Award as well as with a George Foster Peabody Award for his previous work in radio and as an author. WWFM hosts Rachel Katz and Bill Zagorski have been recognized with a New Jersey Society of Professional Journalists Award for the program "Vera's Story," a story of survival through the Holocaust. WWFM's Ted Otten and Michael Kownacky have been awarded a National Federation of Community Broadcasters Silver Reel Award for their program "The Dress Circle."

In addition to the radio frequencies listed below, The Classical Network and JazzOn2 stream at www.wwfm.org.

HD multicasts 
WWFM-HD2 is "JazzOn2", which runs a traditional Jazz format.  WWFM-HD3 is "Viking 89", MCCC student radio.   WXPN's XPoNential Radio service airs on the HD3 when Mercer students are not on the air.
"JazzOn2" is also on the HD2 channel of WWNJ.

Other Classical Network stations

The Classical Network's programming is also available on the HD2 channel of WYPA in Cherry Hill, New Jersey on 89.5 HD2.

Translators

External links
 

 

WFM
Classical music radio stations in the United States
Radio stations established in 1982
NPR member stations
WFM
1982 establishments in New Jersey
WFM